Francisco de la Puebla González (1643–1704) was a Roman Catholic prelate who served as Bishop of Santiago de Chile (1694–1704).

Biography
Francisco de la Puebla González was born in Pradera de Sepulveda, Spain on 9 Jun 1643 and ordained a priest on 17 Dec 1667.
On 8 Nov 1694, he was appointed during the papacy of Pope Innocent XII as Bishop of Santiago de Chile.
On 29 Jul 1695, he was consecrated bishop. 
He served as Bishop of Santiago de Chile until his death on 21 Jan 1704. 
While bishop, he was the principal co-consecrator of Julián Cano y Tevar, Bishop of Urgell (1695); and Tomás Reluz, Bishop of Oviedo (1697).

References 

17th-century Roman Catholic bishops in Chile
18th-century Roman Catholic bishops in Chile
Bishops appointed by Pope Innocent XII
1643 births
1704 deaths
Roman Catholic bishops of Santiago de Chile